Pius Kolagano (born 12 April 1979) is a Botswanan footballer who currently plays for Uniao Flamengo Santos as a defender. He won 15 caps for the Botswana national football team between 2002 and 2004.

External links

Association football defenders
Botswana footballers
Dangerous Darkies players
Uniao Flamengo Santos F.C. players
Botswana international footballers
1979 births
Living people
Botswana Defence Force XI F.C. players
Notwane F.C. players